Key (also known as Keh) is a village in Tudeshk Rural District, Kuhpayeh District, Isfahan County, Isfahan Province, Iran. At the 2006 census, its population was 36, in 9 families.

References 

Populated places in Isfahan County